The 2004–05 season saw Shrewsbury Town's compete in League Two where they finished in 21st position with 49 points.

Final league table

Results

Legend

Football League Two

FA Cup

League Cup

League Trophy

Squad statistics

References

External links
 Shrewsbury 2004–05 at Soccerbase.com
 Shrewsbury 2004–05  at statto.com

Shrewsbury Town F.C. seasons
Shrewsbury Town